WVBI-LP is a Variety formatted broadcast radio station.  The station is licensed to Beaver Island, Michigan, serving St. James and the entirety of Beaver Island in Michigan.  WVBI-LP is owned and operated by The Preservation Association of Beaver Island.

References

External links
 WVBI Online
 

2015 establishments in Michigan
Variety radio stations in the United States
Radio stations established in 2015
VBI-LP
VBI-LP